United States Senate Committee on Civil Service is a defunct committee of the United States Senate. 

The first standing Senate committee with jurisdiction over the civil service was the United States Senate Committee on Civil Service and Retrenchment, which was established on December 4, 1873, following unanimous approval of a resolution introduced by Henry B. Anthony of Rhode Island.  On April 18, 1921, the committee was renamed the United States Senate Committee on Civil Service. 

The Legislative Reorganization Act of 1946 retained the Committee on Civil Service and established the committee's jurisdiction over all the aspects of civil service, the Census Bureau and the government's gathering of statistics, and the National Archives. The act also transferred to the committee jurisdiction over the postal service.

The committee ceased to exist in February 1977, under S. Res. 4 of the 95th Congress when its functions were transferred to the Committee on Governmental Affairs.

In there were select or special committees pertaining to the Civil Service: 
 United States Senate Select Committee to Investigate the Operation of the Civil Service, 1888-1889 (50th Congress)
 United States Senate Select Committee to Examine the Several Branches in the Civil Service, 1875-1921 (43rd-67th Congresses)
 United States Special Committee to Investigate the Administration of the Civil Service System, 1938-1941 (75th-76th Congresses)

Chairmen of the Committee on Civil Service and Retrenchment, 1873-1921
George Wright (R-IA) 1873-1875
Powell Clayton (R-AR) 1875-1877
James G. Blaine (R-ME) 1877
Henry Teller (R-CO) 1877-1879
M. C. Butler (D-SC) 1879-1881
Joseph Hawley (R-CT) 1881-1887
Jonathan Chace (R-RI) 1887-1889
Edward O. Wolcott (R-CO) 1889-1893
Wilkinson Call (D-FL) 1893-1894
Thomas Jarvis (D-NC) 1894-1895
Jeter C. Pritchard (R-NC) 1895-1899
Lucien Baker (R-KS) 1899-1901
George C. Perkins (R-CA) 1901-1909
Albert Cummins (R-IA) 1909-1913
Atlee Pomerene (D-OH) 1913-1917
Kenneth McKellar (D-TN) 1917-1919
Thomas Sterling (R-SD) 1919-1921

Chairmen of the Committee on Civil Service, 1921-1947
Thomas Sterling (R-SD) 1921-1923
Robert Nelson Stanfield (R-OR) 1923-1925
James Couzens (R-MI) 1925-1926
Porter H. Dale (R-VT) 1926-1933
William J. Bulow (D-SD) 1933-1943
Kenneth McKellar (D-TN) 1943-1944
Sheridan Downey (D-CA) 1944-1947

Sources
Chapter 15. Records of the Committee on Post Office and Civil Service and Related Committees, 1816-1968 Guide to the Records of the U.S. Senate at the National Archives (Record Group 46)

Civil Service
1873 establishments in Washington, D.C.
1977 disestablishments in Washington, D.C.